William Bush may refer to:

 William Ernest Bush (died 1903), first and last Baron Freiherr von Bush of Coburg-Gotha
 William Henry Bush (1849–1931), American businessman and rancher
 William Sharp Bush (1786–1812), United States Marine Corps officer who was killed on the USS Constitution during the War of 1812
 William H. T. Bush (1938–2018), American businessperson
 William McKeeva Bush, first Premier of the Cayman Islands
 William Bush (cricketer) (1883–1959), New Zealand cricketer
 William Owen Bush (1832–1907), American farmer and politician in Washington state
 William Bush IV, American politician and member of the Delaware House of Representatives
 Billy Bush (born 1971), American television personality
 Billy Bush (record producer), American record producer
 Billy "Green" Bush (born 1935), American actor
 Bill Bush (born 1949), New Zealand rugby union player